The Woman from Warren's is a 1915 American short drama film directed by Tod Browning.

Cast
 Billy Hutton as Alice Thompson
 F. A. Turner as Fred Thompson (as Fred A. Turner)
 Charles West as Hanson Landing
 Lucille Young as Wynona Ware

References

External links

1915 films
American silent short films
1915 short films
American black-and-white films
1915 drama films
Films directed by Tod Browning
Silent American drama films
1910s American films
1910s English-language films
American drama short films